Zhou Tianhua (born April 10, 1966 in Jiangsu) is a former female shot put athlete from China. She competed at the 1992 Summer Olympics in Barcelona, Spain, finishing in fifth place in the overall-rankings.

Doping 
In 1993 Zhou tested positive for a prohibited substance and was banned from sports by the Chinese Olympic Anti-doping committee.

Achievements

References

sports-reference

1966 births
Living people
Doping cases in athletics
Chinese sportspeople in doping cases
Athletes (track and field) at the 1992 Summer Olympics
Chinese female shot putters
Olympic athletes of China
Athletes from Jiangsu
Universiade medalists in athletics (track and field)
Universiade bronze medalists for China
Medalists at the 1989 Summer Universiade
Medalists at the 1991 Summer Universiade
Medalists at the 1993 Summer Universiade
20th-century Chinese women